Matt McGrath is an American actor.

Early life
McGrath was born into an Irish Catholic family, with parents who worked in local politics. He first resided in Stuyvesant Town, then in Hell's Kitchen, Manhattan, then briefly in Albany, New York.

He started performing on Broadway as a child. McGrath performed in Peter Pan and the original musical Working. He can be heard on the Original Cast Recording released in 2001, singing his solo Neat to Be a Newsboy.

He went to Fordham University for a year, until a professor encouraged him to join the Circle Repertory Company.

Career
As an adult, McGrath appeared in A Streetcar Named Desire with Alec Baldwin and Jessica Lange as the Young Collector and later portrayed the Emcee, originated by Joel Grey, in the Roundabout Theatre Company's production of Kander and Ebb's musical Cabaret. Off-Broadway, McGrath played the title character in Jerry Springer the opera. He also appeared in The Black Rider (including productions in London, San Francisco, Sydney and Los Angeles), The Legend of Georgia McBride (Lucille Lortel & LAOCC Awards), Hedwig and the Angry Inch, A Fair Country, The Collection, Fat Men in Skirts, The Old Boy, and Amulets Against the Dragon Forces, and Dalton's Back (which received a Drama Desk nomination). In regional theatre, McGrath has appeared in The Rocky Horror Show (as Frank ‘N' Furter), Romance and Distant Fires (LA Weekly Award).

He won the 2016 Lucille Lortel Award for Best Featured Performance, as well as the 2017 Drama Critics Circle Award for his portrayal of Miss Tracy Mills in The Legend of Georgia McBride. In The New York Times review of the play, Charles Isherwood wrote, “There isn’t a trace of caricature in his portrayal of the sweetly maternal Tracy”.

In 2020, he was in the Broadway premiere Girl from the North Country.

McGrath's film appearances include roles in The Chaperone, Boys Don't Cry, The Broken Hearts Club: A Romantic Comedy, The Impostors. Full Grown Men and The Notorious Bettie Page. On television, McGrath has appeared on Modern Family where he plays Simon (Mitchell's nemesis from Law School) and on episodes of Pose, Law & Order: Criminal Intent, Now and Again, New York Undercover and Cruel Doubt; he also had a role on the short-lived My Life and Times.

Personal life
McGrath is gay.

Filmography

Films

TV

References

External links
 
 
 

American male stage actors
American male film actors
American male television actors
American gay actors
LGBT people from New York (state)
American people of Irish descent
Living people
Year of birth missing (living people)